The Arista Years is a compilation album that chronicles the Grateful Dead's studio and live albums during their time with Arista Records. The album was released on two-CD and two cassette tapes on October 15, 1996. It contains tracks from Terrapin Station, Shakedown Street, Go to Heaven, Reckoning, Dead Set, In the Dark, Built to Last, and Without a Net. The set does not contain any new or expanded recordings. A  media outlet sampler, Selections from the Arista Years, was released by Arista in January 1997.

Track listing

Disc one
"Estimated Prophet" (Barlow, Weir)  – 5:37
"Passenger" (Lesh, Monk)  – 2:49
"Samson and Delilah" (traditional)  – 3:27
"Terrapin Station [medley]" (Garcia, Hunter)  – 16:20
Tracks 1–4 originally released on the album Terrapin Station.
"Good Lovin'" (Resnick, Clark)  – 4:48
"Shakedown Street" (Garcia, Hunter)  – 4:59
"Fire on the Mountain" (Hart, Hunter)  – 3:46
"I Need a Miracle" (Barlow, Weir)  – 3:33
Tracks 5–8 originally released on the album Shakedown Street.
"Alabama Getaway" (Garcia, Hunter)  – 3:35
"Far from Me" (Mydland)  – 3:39
"Saint of Circumstance" (Barlow, Weir)  – 5:40
Tracks 9-11 originally released on the album Go to Heaven.
"Dire Wolf" (Garcia, Hunter)  – 3:21
"Cassidy" (Barlow, Weir)  – 4:33
Tracks 12–13 originally released on the album Reckoning.
"Feel Like a Stranger" (Barlow, Weir)  – 5:47
"Franklin's Tower" (Garcia, Hunter, Kreutzmann)  – 5:37
Tracks 14–15 originally released on the album Dead Set.

Disc two
"Touch of Grey" (Garcia, Hunter)  – 5:48
"Hell in a Bucket" (Barlow, Weir)  – 5:36
"West L.A. Fadeaway" (Garcia, Hunter)  – 6:37
"Throwing Stones" (Barlow, Weir)  – 7:19
"Black Muddy River" (Garcia, Hunter)  – 5:57
Tracks 16–20 originally released on the album In the Dark.
"Foolish Heart" (Garcia, Hunter)  – 5:10
"Built to Last" (Garcia, Hunter)  – 5:03
"Just a Little Light" (Barlow, Mydland)  – 4:41
"Picasso Moon" (Barlow, Bralove, Weir)  – 6:40
"Standing on the Moon" (Garcia, Hunter)  – 5:20
Tracks 21–25 originally released on the album Built to Last.
"Eyes of the World" (Garcia, Hunter)  – 16:25
Track 26 originally released on the album Without a Net.

Personnel
Grateful Dead
Jerry Garcia – guitar, vocals
Donna Jean Godchaux – vocals
Keith Godchaux – keyboards, vocals
Mickey Hart – drums
Bill Kreutzmann – drums
Phil Lesh – bass
Brent Mydland – keyboards, vocals
Bob Weir – guitar, vocals

Additional performers
Jordan Amarantha – percussion
Branford Marsalis – saxophone (soprano, tenor)
Matthew Kelly – harmonica, harp
Tom Scott – saxophone, lyricon

Production
Jerry Garcia, Lowell George – producers
Bob Bralove – programming, associate producer
Betty Cantor-Jackson, John Cutler, Dan Healy, Gary Lyons, Keith Olsen – producers, engineers
Guy Charbonneau, David DeVore, Tom Flye, Justin Kreutzmann, Bob Matthews, Peter Miller, Jeffrey Norman, David Roberts, Jeff Sterling, Pete Thea, Chris Wiskes – engineers
Amy Finkle, Stanley Mouse, Gilbert Shelton, Jim Welch – art directors
Joe Gastwirt – remastering, digital remastering
Rick Griffin – illustrations
John Kahn – associate producer, horn arrangements
Cameron Sears – coordination
Bob Seidemann – photography
Christopher Stern – design
Robbie Taylor – production manager

Charts
Album – Billboard

References

Grateful Dead compilation albums
1996 compilation albums
Arista Records compilation albums